The List of Lamar University alumni includes notable former students of Lamar University. The term "Lamar Cardinal," which comes from Lamar's mascot "Big Red," a cardinal, refers to current and former students of Lamar University. The class year of each former student indicates the year four years after their enrollment year, and does not necessarily represent graduation year.

Lamar University was previously known as  Lamar College and Lamar State College of Technology (Lamar Tech); this list includes students who graduated when Lamar held different names than the one it holds today.

Academia
 John E. Gray, prominent banker and President of Lamar University 
 Hershel Parker – H. Fletcher Brown Professor Emeritus at the University of Delaware

Athletes and coaches

Baseball
 Beau Allred – retired Major League Baseball outfielder 
 Bruce Aven – retired Major League Baseball player 
 Phil Brassington – retired Australian right-handed pitcher 
 Eric Cammack – retired relief pitcher in Major League Baseball  
 Jerald Clark – retired Major League Baseball outfielder 
 Jim Gilligan – one of the NCAA's most winning baseball coaches 
 Clay Hensley – retired MLB pitcher 
 Micah Hoffpauir – retired MLB player 
 Tony Mack – retired professional baseball player 
 Kevin Millar – MLB World Champion, Boston Red Sox 
 Brian Sanches – retired MLB pitcher
 Mike Sarbaugh – retired minor league baseball player and minor league manager 
 Dave Smith – retired professional baseball pitcher
 Randy Williams – retired professional baseball pitcher
Stijn van der Meer – Infielder in the Houston Astros organization and a member of the Netherlands national baseball team in the 2017 World Baseball Classic
Jonathan Dziedzic – Pitcher in the Kansas City Royals organization

Basketball
 Nicole Aiken-Pinnock – Jamaican netball player 
 Alvin Brooks – associate coach and former head coach of the University of Houston's men's basketball team 
 Adrian Caldwell – retired professional basketball player 
 B. B. Davis – retired basketball player 
James Gulley (born 1965) - former professional basketball player for Ironi Ramat Gan in the Israeli Basketball Premier League
 Clarence Kea – retired professional basketball player 
 Steve Roccaforte – assistant coach at the University of South Florida
 Tom Sewell – retired professional basketball player
 Billy Tubbs – retired men's college basketball coach 
 Keith Veney – retired  professional basketball player

Football
Reggie Begelton - Wide Receiver for the Green Bay Packers
Otho Davis – first athletic trainer nominated for induction into the Pro Football Hall of Fame; Athletic Trainer for the Philadelphia Eagles
 Johnny Fuller – retired NFL player 
 Bobby Jancik – former player in the AFL
 Dudley Meredith – former defensive end in the AFL 
 Wayne Moore – retired NFL player 
 Tracey Perkins – former defensive back in the Arena Football League
 Bum Phillips – head coach and general manager of the Houston Oilers 
 Colin Ridgeway – former NFL player, first Australian to play in the NFL. He also competed in the high jump at the 1956 Summer Olympics.
 Eugene Seale – former NFL player

Golf
 Ronnie Black – PGA Tour professional golfer 
 Dawn Coe-Jones – Canadian LPGA golfer 
 Clifford Ann Creed – retired LPGA golfer 
 Trevor Dodds – Namibian professional golfer 
 Gail Graham – Canadian LPGA golfer 
 Susie McAllister – LPGA golfer 
 John Riegger – PGA Tour professional golfer 
 Chris Stroud – PGA Tour professional golfer 
 Jen Wyatt – Canadian LPGA golfer
 Justin Harding - PGA Tour professional golfer

Tennis
 Sherwood Stewart – retired professional tennis player

Track and field
 Thomas Eriksson – retired male high jumper from Sweden 
 Midde Hamrin – Olympian marathon runner

Arts

Film
 Kelly Asbury – film director, screenwriter, voice actor, children's book author/illustrator, and non-fiction author
 G. W. Bailey –  stage, television and film actor 
 Phyllis Davis – actress

Music
 Janis Joplin – former singer-songwriter 
 Joshua Ledet – American Idol Season 11 Top 3 contestant from Westlake, Louisiana 
 Bob McDill – singer-songwriter 
 Jiles Perry Richardson – former musician and songwriter known as "The Big Bopper"

Visual art
 John Alexander – painter
 Keith Carter – photographer 
 Matchett Herring Coe – former sculptor 
 Marvin Hayes – painter and illustrator 
 Jerry Wilkerson – former artist known for his contemporary pointillistic style of painting

Writers
 H. Palmer Hall – former poet, fiction writer, essayist, editor, and librarian

Business
 Claude H. Nash – CEO of Bloodstone Ventures; researcher
Randy Best – Founder of Academic Partnerships

Media
 Bill Macatee – sports broadcaster

Military
 Harry Brinkley Bass – former U.S. Navy pilot who was twice awarded the Navy Cross for his heroic actions in the Pacific theater during World War II

Politics
 Brian Birdwell (B.S., criminal justice, 1984) – member of the Texas State Senate and survivor of the Pentagon attack of September 11, 2001 
 Jack Brooks – former member of the U.S. House of Representatives, served for forty-two years in the House 
 Charles Holcomb – Texas Appeals Court Judge 
 Nick Lampson – politician, served in the U.S. House of Representatives from two Texas districts 
 Robert Nichols – Republican senator for the 3rd District in the Texas Senate 
 Elvin Santos – former Vice President of Honduras 
Wayne Shaw - Oklahoma State Senator
 Karen Silkwood – former chemical technician and labor union activist

References

External links
 Lamar.edu
 Google Search

	

Lamar University